Lawson's Mates is an Australian television series based on Henry Lawson stories adapted by Cliff Green, first broadcast on the ABC in 1980.

Green's scripts were published as Lawson's mates: six television plays by Hyland House. The script of the episode "Dave Regan and Party" received an AWGIE Award for television adaptation.

References

External links
 

Australian Broadcasting Corporation original programming
1980 Australian television series debuts